Kenneth Joseph Povish (April 19, 1924 – September 5, 2003) was an American prelate of the Roman Catholic Church. He served as bishop of the Diocese of Crookston in Minnesota from 1970 to 1975 and as bishop of the Diocese of Lansing in Michigan from 1975 to 1995.

Biography

Early life 
Kenneth Povish was born in Alpena, Michigan, the eldest child and only son of Joseph and Elizabeth (née Yachaik) Povish. He attended the parochial school of St. Anne's Parish in Gaylord, Michigan, and graduated from Alpena High School in 1942. 

Povish studied for the priesthood at St. Joseph's Seminary in Grand Rapids, Michigan, then at Sacred Heart Seminary in Detroit, where he earned a Bachelor of Arts degree in 1946. Povish completed his priestly studies at the Catholic University of America in Washington, D.C.

Priesthood 
Povish was ordained a priest by Bishop Stephen Woznicki for the Diocese of Saginaw on June 3, 1950. After his ordination, Povish had pastoral assignments in the following Michigan parishes:

 Assistant pastor at St. Ignatius in Rogers City (1950 to 1952) 
 Assistant pastor at St. Hyacinth's in Bay City (1952 to 1956) 
 Pastor at St. Mary's in Port Sanilac (1956 to 1957)
 Pastor at St. Norbert's in Munger (1957 to 1960)

In 1960, Povish joined the faculty at St. Paul's Seminary in Saginaw, Michigan. He left St. Paul's in 1966 to become pastor of St. Stanislaus Parish in Bay City. He was named a prelate of honor in October 1967. In addition to his pastoral duties, Povish served as diocesan director of Catholic Charities and of religious education. He wrote a weekly column entitled "The Question Box" in The Catholic Weekly from 1954 to 1970, and was active in the Mexican apostolate, the League of Catholic Women, and the St. Vincent de Paul Society.

Bishop of Crookston 
On July 28, 1970, Povish was appointed as the fifth bishop of the Diocese of Crookston by Pope Paul VI. He received his episcopal consecration on September 29, 1970, from Archbishop Luigi Raimondi, with Bishops Francis Reh and James Hickey serving s co-consecrators, at the Cathedral of the Immaculate Conception in Crookston Povish selected as his episcopal motto: "To Accomplish His Work" (John 4:34) . During his five-year tenure, he implemented the reforms of the Second Vatican Council, establishing parish councils in each parish and a pastoral council for the diocese. He also supported liturgical reform and the ecumenical movement.

Bishop of Lansing
Following the death of Bishop Alexander M. Zaleski, Paul VI named Povish as the third bishop of the Diocese of Lansing on October 8, 1975. His installation took place on December 11, 1975. As a member of the National Conference of Catholic Bishops (NCCB), he was chair of the Committee for Catholic Charismatic Renewal and of the Committee on Vocations. He was also a member of the NCCB Executive Board, the Committee for Laity, and the Committee for Communications.

Retirement and legacy 
On November 7, 1995, Pope John Paul II accepted Povish's early retirement due to poor health as bishop of the Diocese of Lansing. He then served as apostolic administrator of the diocese until the installation of his successor, Bishop Carl Mengeling in January 1996. 

Kenneth Povish died on September 5, 2003, from colon cancer in Lansing at age 79.

Sources

"Short History of the Diocese of Crookston." Diocese of Crookston. <<http://www.crookston.org/Cathedra/cathedra_Page394.htm>>.

1924 births
2003 deaths
Roman Catholic bishops of Crookston
Roman Catholic bishops of Lansing
20th-century Roman Catholic bishops in the United States
Sacred Heart Major Seminary alumni
Catholic University of America alumni
American people of Polish descent
People from Alpena, Michigan